Rybokarty  is a village in the administrative district of Gmina Gryfice, within Gryfice County, West Pomeranian Voivodeship, in north-western Poland.

The village has a population of 158.

The mansion, built in the 16th century, is used nowadays as a guest house called "Pałac Ptaszynka" (means "Palace Little Bird" in Polish). Before 1637 the area was part of Duchy of Pomerania. For the history of the region, see History of Pomerania.

Notable residents
 Kurt-Bertram von Döring (1889–1960), Luftwaffe General

References

Rybokarty